Geophilus intermissus is a species of soil centipede in the family Geophilidae found in India around the Himalayas. The original description of this species is based on a female specimen measuring 35 mm in length, with 57 pairs of legs, a yellowish red anterior, and especially thin tarsi on the last leg pair.

References 

intermissus
Animals described in 1935
Taxa named by Filippo Silvestri
Arthropods of Asia